The Austrian School is a heterodox school of economic thought that advocates strict adherence to methodological individualism, the concept that social phenomena result exclusively from the motivations and actions of individuals. Austrian school theorists hold that economic theory should be exclusively derived from basic principles of human action.

The Austrian School originated in Vienna with the work of Carl Menger, Eugen von Böhm-Bawerk, Friedrich von Wieser, and others. It was methodologically opposed to the Historical School (based in Germany), in a dispute known as Methodenstreit, or methodology struggle. Current-day economists working in this tradition are located in many different countries, but their work is still referred to as Austrian economics. Among the theoretical contributions of the early years of the Austrian School are the subjective theory of value, marginalism in price theory and the formulation of the economic calculation problem, each of which has become an accepted part of mainstream economics.

Since the mid-20th century, mainstream economists have been critical of the modern-day Austrian School and consider its rejection of mathematical modeling, econometrics and macroeconomic analysis to be outside mainstream economics, or "orthodox" approaches to economics. In the 1970s, the Austrian School attracted some renewed interest after Friedrich Hayek shared the 1974 Nobel Memorial Prize in Economic Sciences with Gunnar Myrdal.

History

Etymology 
The Austrian School owes its name to members of the German historical school of economics, who argued against the Austrians during the late-19th century Methodenstreit ("methodology struggle"), in which the Austrians defended the role of theory in economics as distinct from the study or compilation of historical circumstance. In 1883, Menger published Investigations into the Method of the Social Sciences with Special Reference to Economics, which attacked the methods of the historical school. Gustav von Schmoller, a leader of the historical school, responded with an unfavorable review, coining the term "Austrian School" in an attempt to characterize the school as outcast and provincial. The label endured and was adopted by the adherents themselves.

First wave 

The school originated in Vienna in the Austrian Empire. Carl Menger's 1871 book Principles of Economics is generally considered the founding of the Austrian School. The book was one of the first modern treatises to advance the theory of marginal utility. The Austrian School was one of three founding currents of the marginalist revolution of the 1870s, with its major contribution being the introduction of the subjectivist approach in economics.

Despite such claim, John Stuart Mill had used value in use in this sense in 1848 in Principles of Political Economy, where he wrote: "Value in use, or as Mr. De Quincey calls it, teleologic value, is the extreme limit of value in exchange. The exchange value of a thing may fall short, to any amount, of its value in use; but that it can ever exceed the value in use, implies a contradiction; it supposes that persons will give, to possess a thing, more than the utmost value which they themselves put upon it as a means of gratifying their inclinations."

While marginalism was generally influential, there was also a more specific school that began to coalesce around Menger's work, which came to be known as the "Psychological School", "Vienna School", or "Austrian School". Menger's contributions to economic theory were closely followed by those of Eugen Böhm von Bawerk and Friedrich von Wieser. These three economists became what is known as the "first wave" of the Austrian School. Böhm-Bawerk wrote extensive critiques of Karl Marx in the 1880s and 1890s and was part of the Austrians' participation in the late 19th-century Methodenstreit, during which they attacked the Hegelian doctrines of the historical school.

Early 20th century 
Frank Albert Fetter (1863–1949) was a leader in the United States of Austrian thought. He obtained his PhD in 1894 from the University of Halle and then was made Professor of Political Economy and Finance at Cornell in 1901. Several important Austrian economists trained at the University of Vienna in the 1920s and later participated in private seminars held by Ludwig von Mises. These included Gottfried Haberler, Friedrich Hayek, Fritz Machlup, Karl Menger (son of Carl Menger), Oskar Morgenstern, Paul Rosenstein-Rodan, Abraham Wald, and Michael A. Heilperin, among others, as well as the sociologist Alfred Schütz.

Later 20th century 

By the mid-1930s, most economists had embraced what they considered the important contributions of the early Austrians. Fritz Machlup quoted Hayek's statement that "the greatest success of a school is that it stops existing because its fundamental teachings have become parts of the general body of commonly accepted thought". Sometime during the middle of the 20th century, Austrian economics became disregarded or derided by mainstream economists because it rejected model building and mathematical and statistical methods in the study of economics. Mises' student Israel Kirzner recalled that in 1954, when Kirzner was pursuing his PhD, there was no separate Austrian School as such. When Kirzner was deciding which graduate school to attend, Mises had advised him to accept an offer of admission at Johns Hopkins because it was a prestigious university and Fritz Machlup taught there.

After the 1940s, Austrian economics can be divided into two schools of economic thought and the school "split" to some degree in the late 20th century. One camp of Austrians, exemplified by Mises, regards neoclassical methodology to be irredeemably flawed; the other camp, exemplified by Friedrich Hayek, accepts a large part of neoclassical methodology and is more accepting of government intervention in the economy. Henry Hazlitt wrote economics columns and editorials for a number of publications and wrote many books on the topic of Austrian economics from the 1930s to the 1980s. Hazlitt's thinking was influenced by Mises. His book Economics in One Lesson (1946) sold over a million copies and he is also known for The Failure of the "New Economics" (1959), a line-by-line critique of John Maynard Keynes's General Theory.

The reputation of the Austrian School rose in the late 20th century due in part to the work of Israel Kirzner and Ludwig Lachmann at New York University and to renewed public awareness of the work of Hayek after he won the 1974 Nobel Memorial Prize in Economic Sciences. Hayek's work was influential in the revival of laissez-faire thought in the 20th century.

Split among contemporary Austrians 
Economist Leland Yeager discussed the late 20th-century rift and referred to a discussion written by Murray Rothbard, Hans-Hermann Hoppe, Joseph Salerno and others in which they attack and disparage Hayek. Yeager stated: "To try to drive a wedge between Mises and Hayek on [the role of knowledge in economic calculation], especially to the disparagement of Hayek, is unfair to these two great men, unfaithful to the history of economic thought". He went on to call the rift subversive to economic analysis and the historical understanding of the fall of Eastern European communism.

In a 1999 book published by the Ludwig von Mises Institute, Hoppe asserted that Rothbard was the leader of the "mainstream within Austrian Economics" and contrasted Rothbard with Nobel Laureate Friedrich Hayek, whom he identified as a British empiricist and an opponent of the thought of Mises and Rothbard. Hoppe acknowledged that Hayek was the most prominent Austrian economist within academia, but stated that Hayek was an opponent of the Austrian tradition which led from Carl Menger and Böhm-Bawerk through Mises to Rothbard. Austrian economist Walter Block says that the Austrian School can be distinguished from other schools of economic thought through two categories—economic theory and political theory. According to Block, while Hayek can be considered an Austrian economist, his views on political theory clash with the libertarian political theory which Block sees as an integral part of the Austrian School.

Both criticism from Hoppe and Block to Hayek apply to Carl Menger, the founder of the Austrian School. Hoppe emphasizes that Hayek, which for him is from the English empirical tradition, is an opponent of the supposed rationalist tradition of the Austrian School; Menger made strong critiques to rationalism in his works in similar vein as Hayek's. He emphasized the idea that there are several institutions which were not deliberately created, have a kind of "superior wisdom" and serve important functions to society. He also talked about Burke and the English tradition to sustain these positions.

When saying that the libertarian political theory is an integral part of the Austrian School and supposing Hayek is not a libertarian, Block excludes Menger from the Austrian School too since Menger seems to defend broader state activity than Hayek—for example, progressive taxation and extensive labour legislation.

Economists of the Hayekian view are affiliated with the Cato Institute, George Mason University (GMU) and New York University, among other institutions. They include Peter Boettke, Roger Garrison, Steven Horwitz, Peter Leeson and George Reisman. Economists of the Mises–Rothbard view include Walter Block, Hans-Hermann Hoppe, Jesús Huerta de Soto and Robert P. Murphy, each of whom is associated with the Mises Institute and some of them also with academic institutions. According to Murphy, a "truce between (for lack of better terms) the GMU Austro-libertarians and the Auburn Austro-libertarians" was signed around 2011.

Influence 
Many theories developed by "first wave" Austrian economists have long been absorbed into mainstream economics. These include Carl Menger's theories on marginal utility, Friedrich von Wieser's theories on opportunity cost and Eugen Böhm von Bawerk's theories on time preference, as well as Menger and Böhm-Bawerk's criticisms of Marxian economics.

Former American Federal Reserve Chairman Alan Greenspan said that the founders of the Austrian School "reached far into the future from when most of them practiced and have had a profound and, in my judgment, probably an irreversible effect on how most mainstream economists think in this country". In 1987, Nobel Laureate James M. Buchanan told an interviewer: "I have no objections to being called an Austrian. Hayek and Mises might consider me an Austrian but, surely some of the others would not".

Currently, universities with a significant Austrian presence are George Mason University, New York University, Grove City College, Loyola University New Orleans and Auburn University in the United States; King Juan Carlos University in Spain; and Universidad Francisco Marroquín in Guatemala. Austrian economic ideas are also promoted by privately funded organizations such as the Mises Institute and the Cato Institute.

Methodology 

The Austrian School theorizes that the subjective choices of individuals including individual knowledge, time, expectation and other subjective factors cause all economic phenomena. Austrians seek to understand the economy by examining the social ramifications of individual choice, an approach called methodological individualism. It differs from other schools of economic thought, which have focused on aggregate variables, equilibrium analysis and societal groups rather than individuals.

In the 20th and 21st centuries, economists with a methodological lineage to the early Austrian School developed many diverse approaches and theoretical orientations. Ludwig von Mises organized his version of the subjectivist approach, which he called "praxeology", in a book published in English as Human Action in 1949. In it, Mises stated that praxeology could be used to deduce a priori theoretical economic truths and that deductive economic thought experiments could yield conclusions which follow irrefutably from the underlying assumptions. He wrote that conclusions could not be inferred from empirical observation or statistical analysis and argued against the use of probabilities in economic models.

Since Mises' time, some Austrian thinkers have accepted his praxeological approach while others have adopted alternative methodologies. For example, Fritz Machlup, Friedrich Hayek and others did not take Mises' strong a priori approach to economics. Ludwig Lachmann, a radical subjectivist, also largely rejected Mises' formulation of Praxeology in favor of the verstehende Methode ("interpretive method") articulated by Max Weber.

In the 20th century, various Austrians incorporated models and mathematics into their analysis. Austrian economist Steven Horwitz argued in 2000 that Austrian methodology is consistent with macroeconomics and that Austrian macroeconomics can be expressed in terms of microeconomic foundations. Austrian economist Roger Garrison writes that Austrian macroeconomic theory can be correctly expressed in terms of diagrammatic models. In 1944, Austrian economist Oskar Morgenstern presented a rigorous schematization of an ordinal utility function (the Von Neumann–Morgenstern utility theorem) in Theory of Games and Economic Behavior.

Fundamental tenets 
In 1981, Fritz Machlup listed the typical views of Austrian economic thinking as such:
 Methodological individualism: in the explanation of economic phenomena, we have to go back to the actions (or inaction) of individuals; groups or "collectives" cannot act except through the actions of individual members. Groups don't think; people think.
 Methodological subjectivism: in the explanation of economic phenomena, we have to go back to judgments and choices made by individuals on the basis of whatever knowledge they have or believe to have and whatever expectations they entertain regarding external developments and especially the perceived consequences of their own intended actions.
 Tastes and preferences: subjective valuations of goods and services determine the demand for them so that their prices are influenced by (actual and potential) consumers.
 Opportunity costs: the costs with which producers and other economic actors calculate reflect the alternative opportunities that must be foregone; as productive services are employed for one purpose, all alternative uses have to be sacrificed.
 Marginalism: in all economic designs, the values, costs, revenues, productivity and so on are determined by the significance of the last unit added to or subtracted from the total.
 Time structure of production and consumption: decisions to save reflect "time preferences" regarding consumption in the immediate, distant, or indefinite future and investments are made in view of larger outputs expected to be obtained if more time-taking production processes are undertaken.

He included two additional tenets held by the Mises branch of Austrian economics:
 Consumer sovereignty: the influence consumers have on the effective demand for goods and services and through the prices which result in free competitive markets, on the production plans of producers and investors, is not merely a hard fact but also an important objective, attainable only by complete avoidance of governmental interference with the markets and of restrictions on the freedom of sellers and buyers to follow their own judgment regarding quantities, qualities and prices of products and services.
 Political individualism: only when individuals are given full economic freedom will it be possible to secure political and moral freedom. Restrictions on economic freedom lead, sooner or later, to an extension of the coercive activities of the state into the political domain, undermining and eventually destroying the essential individual liberties which the capitalistic societies were able to attain in the 19th century.

Contributions to economic thought

Opportunity cost 

The opportunity cost doctrine was first explicitly formulated by the Austrian economist Friedrich von Wieser in the late 19th century. Opportunity cost is the cost of any activity measured in terms of the value of the next best alternative foregone (that is not chosen). It is the sacrifice related to the second best choice available to someone, or group, who has picked among several mutually exclusive choices. Although a more ephemeral scarcity, expectations of the future must also be considered. Quantified as time preference, opportunity cost must also be valued with respect to one’s preference for present versus future investments. 

Opportunity cost is a key concept in mainstream economics and has been described as expressing "the basic relationship between scarcity and choice". The notion of opportunity cost plays a crucial part in ensuring that resources are used efficiently.

Capital and interest 

The Austrian theory of capital and interest was first developed by Eugen Böhm von Bawerk. He stated that interest rates and profits are determined by two factors, namely supply and demand in the market for final goods and time preference.

Böhm-Bawerk's theory equates capital intensity with the degree of roundaboutness of production processes. Böhm-Bawerk also argued that the law of marginal utility necessarily implies the classical law of costs. Some Austrian economists therefore entirely reject the notion that interest rates are affected by liquidity preference.

Inflation 

In Mises's definition, inflation is an increase in the supply of money: 

Hayek pointed out that inflationary stimulation exploits the lag between an increase in money supply and the consequent increase in the prices of goods and services:

Economic calculation problem 

The economic calculation problem refers to a criticism of planned economies which was first stated by Max Weber in 1920. Mises subsequently discussed Weber's idea with his student Friedrich Hayek, who developed it in various works including The Road to Serfdom. What the calculation problem essentially states is that without price signals, the factors of production cannot be allocated in the most efficient way possible, rendering planned economies inefficacious.

Austrian theory emphasizes the organizing power of markets. Hayek stated that market prices reflect information, the totality of which is not known to any single individual, which determines the allocation of resources in an economy. Because socialist systems lack the individual incentives and price discovery processes by which individuals act on their personal information, Hayek argued that socialist economic planners lack all of the knowledge required to make optimal decisions. Those who agree with this criticism view it as a refutation of socialism, showing that socialism is not a viable or sustainable form of economic organization. The debate rose to prominence in the 1920s and 1930s and that specific period of the debate has come to be known by historians of economic thought as the socialist calculation debate.

Mises argued in a 1920 essay "Economic Calculation in the Socialist Commonwealth" that the pricing systems in socialist economies were necessarily deficient because if the government owned the means of production, then no prices could be obtained for capital goods as they were merely internal transfers of goods in a socialist system and not "objects of exchange", unlike final goods. Therefore, they were unpriced and hence the system would be necessarily inefficient since the central planners would not know how to allocate the available resources efficiently. This led him to write "that rational economic activity is impossible in a socialist commonwealth".

Business cycles 

The Austrian theory of the business cycle (ABCT) focuses on banks' issuance of credit as the cause of economic fluctuations. Although later elaborated by Hayek and others, the theory was first set forth by Mises, who posited that fractional reserve banks extend credit at artificially low interest rates, causing businesses to invest in relatively roundabout production processes which leads to an artificial "boom". Mises stated that this artificial "boom" then led to a misallocation of resources which he called "malinvestment" - which eventually must end in a "bust".

Mises surmised how government manipulation of money and credit in the banking system throws savings and investment out of balance, resulting in misdirected investment projects that are eventually found to be unsustainable, at which point the economy has to rebalance itself through a period of corrective recession. Austrian economist Fritz Machlup summarized the Austrian view by stating, "monetary factors cause the cycle but real phenomena constitute it." For Austrians, the only prudent strategy for government is to leave money and the financial system to the free market's competitive forces to eradicate the business cycle's inflationary booms and recessionary busts, allowing markets to keep people's saving and investment decisions in place for well-coordinated economic stability and growth.

A Keynesian would suggest government intervention during a recession to inject spending into the economy when people will not. However, the heart of Austrian macroeconomic theory states the government "fine tuning" through expansions and contractions in the money supply orchestrated by the government are actually the cause of business cycles because of the differing impact of the resulting interest rate changes on different stages in the structure of production. Austrian economist Thomas Woods further supports this view by arguing it is not consumption, but rather production that should be emphasized. A country cannot become rich by consuming, and therefore, by using up all their resources. Instead, production is what enables consumption as a possibility in the first place, since a producer would be working for nothing, if not for the desire to consume.

Central banks
According to Ludwig von Mises, central banks enable the commercial banks to fund loans at artificially low interest rates, thereby inducing an unsustainable expansion of bank credit and impeding any subsequent contraction and argued for a gold standard to constrain growth in fiduciary media. Friedrich Hayek took a different perspective not focusing on gold but focusing on regulation of the banking sector via strong central banking.

Criticism

General 
Mainstream economists generally reject modern-day Austrian economics, and argue that modern-day Austrian economists are excessively averse to the use of mathematics and statistics in economics. Austrian opposition to mathematization extends to economic theorizing only, as they argue that human behavior is too variable for overarching mathematical models to hold true across time and context. Austrians do, however, support analyzing revealed preference via mathematization to aid business and finance.

Economist Paul Krugman has stated that Austrians are unaware of holes in their own thinking because they do not use "explicit models".

Economist Benjamin Klein has criticized the economic methodological work of Austrian economist Israel M. Kirzner. While praising Kirzner for highlighting shortcomings in traditional methodology, Klein argued that Kirzner did not provide a viable alternative for economic methodology. Economist Tyler Cowen has written that Kirzner's theory of entrepreneurship can ultimately be reduced to a neoclassical search model and is thus not in the radical subjectivist tradition of Austrian praxeology. Cowen states that Kirzner's entrepreneurs can be modeled in mainstream terms of search.

Economist Jeffrey Sachs argues that among developed countries, those with high rates of taxation and high social welfare spending perform better on most measures of economic performance compared to countries with low rates of taxation and low social outlays. He concludes that Friedrich Hayek was wrong to argue that high levels of government spending harms an economy and "a generous social-welfare state is not a road to serfdom but rather to fairness, economic equality and international competitiveness".

Economist Bryan Caplan has noted that Mises has been criticized for overstating the strength of his case in describing socialism as "impossible" rather than as something that would need to establish non-market institutions to deal with the inefficiency.

Methodology 
Critics generally argue that Austrian economics lacks scientific rigor and rejects scientific methods and the use of empirical data in modelling economic behavior. Some economists describe Austrian methodology as being a priori or non-empirical.

Economist Mark Blaug has criticized over-reliance on methodological individualism, arguing it would rule out all macroeconomic propositions that cannot be reduced to microeconomic ones, and hence reject almost the whole of received macroeconomics.

Economist Thomas Mayer has stated that Austrians advocate a rejection of the scientific method which involves the development of empirically falsifiable theories. Furthermore, economists have developed numerous experiments that elicit useful information about individual preferences.

Although economist Leland Yeager is sympathetic to Austrian economics, he rejects many favorite views of the Misesian group of Austrians, in particular "the specifics of their business-cycle theory, ultra-subjectivism in value theory and particularly in interest-rate theory, their insistence on unidirectional causality rather than general interdependence, and their fondness for methodological brooding, pointless profundities, and verbal gymnastics".

Economist Paul A. Samuelson wrote in 1964 that most economists believe that economic conclusions reached by pure logical deduction are limited and weak. According to Samuelson and Caplan, Mises' deductive methodology also embraced by Murray Rothbard and to a lesser extent by Mises' student Israel Kirzner was not sufficient in and of itself.

Business cycle theory 
Mainstream economic research regarding Austrian business cycle theory finds that it is inconsistent with empirical evidence. Noted economists such as Gordon Tullock, Milton Friedman and Paul Krugman have said that they regard the theory as incorrect. Austrian economist Ludwig Lachmann noted that the Austrian theory was rejected during the 1930s:

Theoretical objections 
Some economists have argued that Austrian business cycle theory requires bankers and investors to exhibit a kind of irrationality because the Austrian theory posits that investors will be fooled repeatedly (by temporarily low interest rates) into making unprofitable investment decisions. Milton Friedman objected to the policy implications of the theory, stating the following in a 1998 interview:

Empirical objections 
In 1969, Milton Friedman examined the history of business cycles in the United States and wrote that there "appears to be no systematic connection between the size of an expansion and of the succeeding contraction", contradicting business cycle theories (such as the Austrian business cycle theory) which rely on that premise. He analyzed the issue using newer data in 1993, and again reached the same conclusion. Referring to Friedman's discussion of the business cycle, Austrian economist Roger Garrison argued that Friedman's empirical findings are "broadly consistent with both Monetarist and Austrian views" and goes on to argue that although Friedman's model "describes the economy's performance at the highest level of aggregation, Austrian theory offers an insightful account of the market process that might underlie those aggregates".

See also 

 Carl Menger
 Chicago school of economics
 Criticism of the Federal Reserve
 Eugen von Böhm-Bawerk
 Friedrich Hayek
 Hans-Hermann Hoppe
 Henry Hazlitt
 Israel Kirzner
 List of Austrian intellectual traditions
 List of Austrian School economists
 Ludwig von Mises
 New institutional economics
 Perspectives on capitalism by school of thought
 School of Salamanca
 Gold standard

Notes and references

Further reading 
 
  PDF .
   
  
   
 
 
  (Excerpt via Amazon).

External links 

Understanding Austrian Economics by Henry Hazlitt 
 

 
Schools of economic thought
Libertarian theory